Merritt L. Campbell (March 26, 1864 – October 11, 1915) was an American lawyer, businessman, and politician.

Born in Omro, Winnebago County, Wisconsin, Campbell went to Omro High School. He then went to the University of Wisconsin and Valparaiso University. In 1888, Campbell was admitted to the Wisconsin bar and practiced law in Neenah, Wisconsin. He served as Neenah city attorney and on the Winnebago County Board of Supervisors. In 1901, Campbell was elected mayor of Neenah and was a Democrat. In 1907, Campbell served in the Wisconsin State Assembly. He was involved with an insurance society: the Equitable Fraternal Society. Campbell died at his home in Neenah, Wisconsin.

Notes

1864 births
1915 deaths
Politicians from Neenah, Wisconsin
Valparaiso University alumni
University of Wisconsin–Madison alumni
Businesspeople from Wisconsin
Wisconsin lawyers
County supervisors in Wisconsin
Mayors of places in Wisconsin
People from Omro, Wisconsin
19th-century American businesspeople
19th-century American lawyers
Democratic Party members of the Wisconsin State Assembly